Andrey Nascimento dos Santos (born 3 May 2004) is a Brazilian professional footballer who plays as a central midfielder for Campeonato Brasileiro Série A club Vasco da Gama, on loan from Premier League club Chelsea.

Club career

Vasco da Gama
At the age of four, Santos was introduced to futsal in an effort to lose weight. He fell in love with the game, and began playing as a defender, before being moved up to midfield during his time in Vasco da Gama's youth academy.

On 6 March 2021, at the age of 16, Santos made his professional debut for Vasco da Gama as an 85th-minute substitute in a 1–0 Campeonato Carioca loss away to Volta Redonda. He would go on to make his league debut in a 3–0 Série B defeat away to Londrina on 28 November 2021. In the 2022 season, Vasco manager Zé Ricardo made Santos a starter in the team, propelling his career to new heights. He became the youngest goalscorer in the club's history on 7 June 2022, netting in a 3–2 Série B victory away to Náutico.

Chelsea
On 6 January 2023, Vasco da Gama announced that Santos had departed the club to join Premier League club Chelsea.

International career
Santos represented Brazil's under-15s at the 2019 South American U-15 Championship. He has also represented his nation at under-20 level. Santos captained the under-20s en route to an undefeated title in the 2023 South American U-20 Championship, scoring a joint-top six goals during the tournament.

Career statistics

Club

Honours
Brazil U20
 South American U-20 Championship: 2023

References

2004 births
Living people
Footballers from Rio de Janeiro (city)
Brazilian footballers
Brazil youth international footballers
Association football midfielders
CR Vasco da Gama players
Chelsea F.C. players
Campeonato Brasileiro Série B players
Campeonato Brasileiro Série A players
Brazilian expatriate footballers
Expatriate footballers in England
Brazilian expatriate sportspeople in England